USS ARD-10 was an auxiliary repair dock in the service of the United States Navy in World War II as an auxiliary floating drydock, built by Pacific Bridge Company. As was common with other auxiliary repair docks, the ship was only known by her designation and was not otherwise named.

ARD-10 was commissioned in Alameda, California in October 1943. Yuma and ARD-10 finally arrived at Fremantle, Western Australia, on 6 March 1944. There ARD-10 served the submarine base until end of the war.

ARD-10 returned to the United States after  in 1946. She was stricken from US Navy service in July 1972 and subsequently sold to Bendershipbuilding Repair Co. of Mexico.  the ship was still operational.
 
ARD-10 was a member of the ARD-2 class of Auxiliary Repair Drydocks (ARD).  The ARD-2 class of drydocks dates to early World War II and were towed to where they were required, generally forward area anchorages. Five of the 7 ARD-2-class drydocks built are still in existence in foreign navies. The  ARD could handle World War II-era ships up to destroyer size.

References
 Account of a sailor on the Yuma during her journey with ARD-10 to Australia
Navsource
Visible Letters 'ARD 10' on aft hull of background ship in the Clint Eastwood movie, "Magnum Force", visible just over Hal Holbrook's shoulder in final scene of the film at San Francisco Dock 54.

ARD-2-class floating drydocks
Ships built in Alameda, California
1943 ships
World War II auxiliary ships of the United States
Floating drydocks of the United States Navy